The Zee Cine Award Best Actor in a Negative Role is chosen by a jury organized by Zee Entertainment Enterprises, and the winner is announced at the ceremony. It awards the actor or actress in the role of an antagonist.

Kajol was the first woman to win this award.

The winners are listed below:-

See also 

 Zee Cine Awards
 Bollywood
 Cinema of India

Zee Cine Award Best Actor in a Negative Role